The Goat is the second studio album by American rapper Polo G. It was released on May 15, 2020, by Columbia Records. The album features guest appearances from Mustard, Juice Wrld, Stunna 4 Vegas, NLE Choppa, Mike Will Made It, Lil Baby, and BJ the Chicago Kid. It contains the singles "Heartless" featuring Mustard, "DND", and "Go Stupid" with Stunna 4 Vegas and NLE Choppa, featuring Mike Will Made It, which were all released prior to the album.

The album debuted number two on the Billboard 200 chart, with 104,000 album-equivalent units, (of which 14,000 were pure album sales) in its first week. On December 10, 2020, the album was certified Platinum by the Recording Industry Association of America (RIAA) for sales of over 1,000,000 units. It received generally positive reviews from critics.

Background and promotion
The album, along with its cover, was announced on May 5, 2020, through Polo G's Instagram.

Singles
On September 20, 2019, the album's first single, "Heartless" featuring American record producer Mustard, was released along with its music video.

On February 14, 2020, "Go Stupid" with Stunna 4 Vegas and NLE Choppa, featuring Mike Will Made It, was released as the album's second single.

On April 10, 2020, the third single off the album, "DND", was released.

Critical reception

The Goat was met with widespread critical acclaim upon release. At Metacritic, which assigns a normalized rating out of 100 to reviews from professional publications, the release received an average score of 83, based on five reviews, indicating "universal acclaim".

Paul A. Thompson of Pitchfork stated that "The Chicago rapper's follow-up to his riveting debut LP argues for him as an adaptable and unmissable talent, an unlikely star in a new major-label system".

Commercial performance
The Goat debuted at number two on the US Billboard 200 chart, with 99,000 album-equivalent units, (of which 14,000 were pure album sales) in its first week. It became Polo G's highest-charting album, and his second US top ten debut. The album also accumulated a total of 129.4 million in on-demand streams of the set's songs. In its second week, the album dropped to number five on the chart, earning an additional 52,000 units. In its third week, the album dropped to number seven on the chart, earning 40,000 more units. In its fourth week, the album dropped to number seven on the chart, earning 37,000 units, bringing its four-week total to 228,000 album-equivalent units. On July 28, 2020, the album was certified gold by the Recording Industry Association of America (RIAA) for combined sales and album-equivalent units of over 500,000 units in the United States.

Track listing
Track listing and credits adapted from Tidal.

Notes
  signifies a co-producer
  signifies an additional producer
  signifies an uncredited co-producer

Sample credits
 "Wishing for a Hero" contains samples from "Changes", written by Tupac Shakur, Bruce Hornsby, and Deon Evans, and performed by 2Pac featuring Talent; "Changes" itself contains samples from "The Way It Is", written by Bruce Hornsby.

Charts

Weekly charts

Year-end charts

Certifications

References

2020 albums
Polo G albums
Columbia Records albums
Albums produced by Hit-Boy
Albums produced by Tay Keith
Albums produced by DJ Mustard
Albums produced by Murda Beatz
Albums produced by Mike Will Made It